Anne Harris may refer to:

Anne Harris (journalist) (born 1947), Irish newspaper editor
Anne Harris (musician), American singer-songwriter
Anne Harris (sculptor) (born 1928), Canadian sculptor
Anne Harris (author) (1964–2022), American science fiction author

See also
Anna Harris (born 1998), English cricket umpire and former player